Judges of England can refer to:
 Judiciary of England and Wales
 Biographia Juridica (1870), a book by Edward Foss about English judges